The 2022 Troy Trojans baseball team represented Troy University during the 2022 NCAA Division I baseball season. The Trojans played their home games at Riddle–Pace Field and were led by first-year head coach Skylar Meade. They were members of the Sun Belt Conference.

Preseason

Signing Day Recruits

Sun Belt Conference Coaches Poll
The Sun Belt Conference Coaches Poll was released on February 9, 2022.  Troy was picked to finish sixth with 74 votes.

Preseason All-Sun Belt Team & Honors

Miles Smith (USA, Sr, Pitcher)
Hayden Arnold (LR, Sr, Pitcher)
Tyler Tuthill (APP, Jr, Pitcher)
Brandon Talley (LA, Sr, Pitcher)
Caleb Bartolero (TROY, Jr, Catcher)
Jason Swan (GASO, Sr, 1st Base)
Luke Drumheller (APP, Jr, 2nd Base)
Eric Brown (CCU, Jr, Shortstop)
Ben Klutts (ARST, Sr, 3rd Base)
Christian Avant (GASO, Sr, Outfielder)
Josh Smith (GSU, Jr, Outfielder)
Rigsby Mosley (TROY, Sr, Outfielder)
Cameron Jones (GSU, So, Utility)
Noah Ledford (GASO, Jr, Designated Hitter)

Personnel

Schedule and results

Schedule Source:
*Rankings are based on the team's current ranking in the D1Baseball poll.

References

Troy
 Troy Trojans baseball seasons
Troy Trojans baseball